Frunzensky District is a district of the federal city of St. Petersburg, Russia. As of the 2010 Census, its population: was 401,779; down from 405,274 recorded in the 2002 Census.

History
The district was established in April 1936.

In November 2017, it was proposed to rename the Frunzensky District into in Kupchinsky District (according to its historical name) in the course of the struggle against revolutionary names. However, the proposals were mostly ignored and not supported by locals.

Municipal divisions
Frunzensky District comprises the following six municipal okrugs:
#72
Aleksandrovsky
Balkansky
Georgiyevsky
Kupchino
Volkovskoye

References

Notes

Sources

External links
Official website of Frunzensky District Police 

 
States and territories established in 1936